Eric Jansen (born 5 May 2000) is a German professional footballer who plays as a defender for FC Astoria Walldorf.

References

External links
 Profile at DFB.de
 Profile at kicker.de
 

2000 births
Living people
German footballers
Germany youth international footballers
Association football defenders
Karlsruher SC II players
Karlsruher SC players
FC Astoria Walldorf players
3. Liga players